Huang Minqiang (born October 1960) is a Chinese mathematician and computer scientist, with a specialization in information processing. He is a research professor of the 58th Research Institute of the People's Liberation Army Strategic Support Force. He is an academician of the Chinese Academy of Sciences and an alternate member of the 19th Central Committee of the Communist Party of China.

Biography 
Huang was born in October 1960 in Shanghai. He graduated from the Department of Mathematics of Fudan University in 1980, and earned his Ph.D. from the University of Science and Technology of China in 1989.

Huang is a research professor of the 58th Research Institute of the People's Liberation Army Strategic Support Force. His research focus is on information processing, systems analysis, and discrete mathematics. He served as a member of the Information Assurance Expert  Group of the 863 Program.

In 2005, Huang was elected an academician of the Chinese Academy of Sciences. He was elected an alternate member of the 19th Central Committee of the Communist Party of China in 2017.

References 

1960 births
Living people
Alternate members of the 19th Central Committee of the Chinese Communist Party
Chinese computer scientists
Fudan University alumni
Mathematicians from Shanghai
Members of the Chinese Academy of Sciences
People's Liberation Army Strategic Support Force
University of Science and Technology of China alumni